WJSA-FM (96.3 FM) is a radio station licensed to Jersey Shore, Pennsylvania, United States, the station serves the Williamsport area.  The station is currently owned by Montrose Broadcasting Company.

Translators
In addition to the main station, WJSA-FM is relayed by an additional translator to widen its broadcast area.

History
WJSA was originally an AM-only radio station authorized to operate during the daytime at 1600 kHz. Though not a Christian format, the station did air some daily devotional programs. In the fall of 1980 the station's owner, Williamsport businessman Ken Breon, sought the help of John Hogg as broadcast engineer and programming consultant, then within the year as general manager. Under Hogg's management and with Mr. Breon's agreement and involvement, the station changed format to full-time Christian programming. The AM station also extended its hours of operation and improved coverage.

The Birth of WJSA-FM
39 years ago, Hogg identified an available FM frequency which would provide extended coverage and allow 24 hours a day service. Two years later the FCC granted the application and WJSA-FM began broadcasting on November 1, 1984 with a power of 3,000 watts on 93.5 MHz. A new company to operate the facilities was formed, Covenant Broadcast Company, a partnership between Ken Breon and John Hogg.

Expanding the FM coverage
Almost immediately, Hogg identified the opportunity for several stations in the area to upgrade their signal strength by changing frequencies. This required cooperation of those stations and FCC approval took the next 12 years. In the early spring of 1997 this power upgrade was realized and WJSA-FM's frequency was changed to 96.3 MHz with a power equivalent of 25,000 watts.

References

External links

JSA-FM
Radio stations established in 1980